The E Line is a light rail line which is part of the rail system operated by the Regional Transportation District in the Denver metropolitan area in Colorado. The line was added to the system on November 17, 2006, with the completion of the Southeast Corridor as part of the T-REX Project. It is one of four routes that are part of the RTD's service plan for the corridor. Although it operates seven days per week, the E line does not operate during midday hours on weekdays as of January 11, 2009.

According to a map in the RTD's current service plan for the corridor, the E Line's color is purple, also referred to as 'plum'.

Route 
The E Line's northern terminus is at Union Station in downtown Denver. It shares track with the C Line from Union Station to I-25 & Broadway, then diverges by a level junction onto a flyover, and then parallels Interstate 25 from there to Lincoln Avenue in Lone Tree.

Stations

FasTracks 

The extension cost $223 million to construct and was opened on May 17, 2019.

References

External links 

RTD E Line Schedule

RTD light rail
Transportation in Arapahoe County, Colorado
Transportation in Douglas County, Colorado
Railway lines opened in 2006
750 V DC railway electrification